Emeopedus is a genus of beetles in the family Cerambycidae, containing the following species:

subgenus Emeopedus
 Emeopedus degener Pascoe, 1864
 Emeopedus insidiosus Pascoe, 1864
 Emeopedus solutus Pascoe, 1864

subgenus Longicornemeopedus
 Emeopedus alboguttatus Fisher, 1935
 Emeopedus griseomarmoratus Breuning, 1956
 Emeopedus longicornis Fisher, 1925
 Emeopedus pulchellus Heller, 1924

subgenus Papuemeopedus
 Emeopedus baloghi Breuning, 1975
 Emeopedus papuanus Breuning, 1959

subgenus Variegatemeopedus
 Emeopedus variegatus Fisher, 1927

References

Acanthocinini